Cristóbal Lander (born June 8, 1977) is a Venezuelan actor and model.

Biography
Lander became famous after participating in the 2000 Mister Venezuela where he was a finalist.

His first acting role came in 2006 when he starred in the telenovela Por Todo lo Alto playing the character of Rodolfo. A year later, he got another break when he landed the role in the Telemundo TV series, Sin vergüenza.

In 2009 he landed the leading role in the TV series Pobre Diabla in Mexico alongside Alejandra Lazcano.

In 2014, he participated in the telenovela Corazón Esmeralda produced by Venevisión.

Personal life
In 2007, Cristóbal married Venezuelan actress Gaby Espino. In July 2008, their daughter Oriana Lander Espino was born. The couple separated in early 2010, reconciled in November 2010 and divorced in March 2011.

On February 24, 2013, Lander married Venezuelan actress and model Paula Bevilacqua. Their first child, Cristobal Lander Bevilacqua, was born in March 2013, and their second child, a son named Massimo Lander Bevilacqua, was born in August 2015.

Filmography

References

External links
 
 Twitter Official
 Instagram Official

Venezuelan male television actors
Venezuelan male telenovela actors
Venezuelan male models
Venezuelan people of German descent
Living people
People from Caracas
1978 births